Spirit of Akasha is an Australian surfing film. Its soundtrack album was nominated for a 2014 ARIA Award for Best Original Soundtrack, Cast or Show Album.

Film
Spirit of Akasha is a follow-up to Morning of the Earth directed by Andrew Kidman. It was an attempt to "recapture the values and spirit that was represented in Morning of the Earth but this time also feature women surfing." It debuted at the Sydney Opera House on the 25th of January 2014.

It was filmed in 2012 and 2013 and the surfers featured include Sam Yoon, Mick Fanning, Stephanie Gilmore, Tom Curren, Kelly Slater, Ellis Ericson, Kye and Joel Fitzgerald, Heath Joske, and Harrison Roach.

Fred Pawle of The Australian gave it a mixed review, writing that it "has many beguiling moments that will entertain surfers and non-surfers alike, but it will never define its era as Morning of the Earth did." Bernard Zuel wrote in the Sydney Morning Herald that "it could make even the aquaphobe start considering what it would be like to be that deeply immersed in nature, all to a dreamscape soundtrack."

Soundtrack
Samuel J. Fell writing in Rolling Stone gave it 4/5 stars calling it "an incredible soundtrack to a stellar film." The Sydney Morning Herald's Bernard Zuel praised the album writing "The beauty of the new soundtrack is how it gels with but also expands on the spirit of the original." Meredith McLean of the AU. Review gave it 9/10 saying "This project is a wonderful way to mirror a very overlooked part of our nation’s history."

Track listing

 To Be Young - Andrew Kidman And The Windy Hills
 Drifting On A Daydream - Grouplove
 I Just Knew - Andrew VanWyngarden
 Starcrossed Lonely Sailor - Chris Robinson Brotherhood
 What The Devil Has Made - Matt Corby
 Wavves - Jack River
 Before Your Very Eyes - Atoms For Peace
 Akasha - Canyons Featuring Lee-Ann Curren
 Spirit Of Akasha - Corsaire (Ben Howard, Mickey Smith, Nat Wason)
 Great Divine - Xavier Rudd

 Unchained - Tom Curren
 Dancing Through The Air (part 1) - Brian Cadd & Tim Gaze
 Gravity - Lee-Ann Curren
 The Weatherman - Angus Stone
 We Love Our Hole - Bonnie 'Prince' Billy & The Cairo Gang
 In My Moondreams - Brian Wilson
 The Pier - Dirty Three
 Colouring The Streets - Pond
 The Burren - Corsaire (Ben Howard, Mickey Smith, Nat Wason)
 Old Mother Sea - Bill Bensing
 Dancing Through The Air (reprise) - Brian Cadd & Tim Gaze

 "What the Devil Has Made" was released as a single in January 2014.

References

External links
Spirit Of Akasha

2014 films
Documentary films about surfing
Compilation albums by Australian artists
Australian surfing films
Australian sports documentary films